Tetreuaresta heringi is a species of tephritid or fruit flies in the genus Tetreuaresta of the family Tephritidae.

Distribution
Colombia.

References

Tephritinae
Insects described in 1999
Diptera of South America